The following list sorts all cities (including towns) in the Iranian province of Khuzestan with a population of more than 10,000 according to the 2016 Census. As of September 24, 2016, 36 places fulfill this criterion and are listed here. This list refers only to the population of individual cities, towns and villages within their defined limits, which does not include other municipalities or suburban areas within urban agglomerations.

List 
The following table lists the 36 cities in Khuzestan with a population of at least 10,000 on September 24, 2016. The table also gives an overview of the evolution of the population since the 1996 census.

References 

Khuzestan